The 2003 European Speedway Club Champions' Cup.

Group A

Final

See also

2003
Euro C